"Unbothered" is a song by American singer Tori Kelly. The track was released as the second single from her third extended play (EP), Solitude, on August 11, 2020.

Background
Jorgen Odegard wrote some of the song and produced the entirety of it, while Kelly recorded it all from her home.
 
Other writers include Chloe George and Micah Premnath.

Performances
Kelly performed the single on The Late Late Show with James Corden on August 13. 

She performed "Unbothered" the next day, August 14, on The Late Show with Stephen Colbert.

Charts

References

2020 singles
2020 songs
Tori Kelly songs
Capitol Records singles